Marcus Actorius Naso seems to have written a life of Julius Caesar, or a history of his times, which is quoted by Suetonius.

Although we have very little evidence to go on, it seems probable he was anti-Caesar in tone.

The time at which he lived is uncertain, but from the way in which he is referred to by Suetonius, he would almost seem to have been a contemporary of Caesar.

References

Golden Age Latin writers
1st-century BC Romans
Latin writers known only from secondary sources